The Nika riots, Nika revolt or Nika sedition took place against Byzantine Emperor Justinian I in Constantinople over the course of a week in 532 AD. They are often regarded as the most violent riots in the city's history, with nearly half of Constantinople being burned or destroyed and tens of thousands of people killed.

Background
The ancient Roman and Byzantine empires had well-developed associations, known as demes, which supported the different factions (or teams) to which competitors in certain sporting events belonged, especially in chariot racing. There were initially four major factions in chariot racing, differentiated by the colour of the uniform in which they competed; the colours were also worn by their supporters. These were the Blues (Veneti), the Greens (Prasini), the Reds (Russati), and the Whites (Albati), although by the 6th century the only teams with any influence were the Blues and Greens. Emperor Justinian I was a supporter of the Blues.

The demes had become a focus for various social and political issues for which the general Byzantine population lacked other forms of outlet. They combined aspects of street gangs and political parties, taking positions on current issues, including theological problems and claimants to the throne. They frequently tried to affect imperial policy by shouting political demands between races. The imperial forces and guards in the city could not keep order without the cooperation of the factions, which were in turn backed by the aristocratic families of the city; these included some families who believed they had a more rightful claim to the throne than Justinian.

In 531 some members of the Blues and Greens were arrested for murder in connection with deaths during rioting after a chariot race. Relatively limited riots were not unknown at chariot races, similar to the football hooliganism that occasionally erupts after association football matches in modern times. The murderers were to be executed, and most of them were. However, on January 10, 532, two of them, a Blue and a Green, escaped and sought sanctuary in a church surrounded by an angry mob.

Justinian was nervous: he was in the midst of negotiating with the Persians over peace in the east at the end of the Iberian War, and now he faced a potential crisis in his city. Therefore, he declared that a chariot race would be held on January 13 and commuted the sentences to imprisonment. The Blues and the Greens responded by demanding that the two men be pardoned entirely.

Causes
Emperor Justinian, along with his prominent officials John the Cappadocian and Tribonian, faced significant public disapproval due to the implementation of high tax rates, allegations of corruption against the latter two officials, and John's reported harsh treatment of debtors. Justinian and John also reduced expenditure on the civil service and took steps to combat corruption within the civil service. Numerous nobles, who had suffered a loss of power and wealth as a result of the downsizing and reform of the civil service, joined the ranks of the Greens. Justinian also took steps to diminish the influence of both teams. This was perceived by the Greens as an oppressive action akin to the reforms implemented in the civil service, while the Blues felt a sense of betrayal. The Roman legal code was widely perceived as a marker that distinguished the civilised Romans from "barbarians".. The law code was also religiously important as the Romans were believed to be "chosen by God", it being a symbol of justice. As a result, the successful implementation of significant legal reforms by an emperor was viewed as lending legitimacy to their reign, while a lack of progress in this area was interpreted as a sign of divine displeasure. What had taken nine years for the Theodosian code took Justinian just thirteen months.

However, prior to the Nika riots of January 532, the pace of legal reforms had significantly slowed. Concurrently, Justinian was engaged in an unsuccessful war against the Persian Empire. While initial Byzantine victories at Dara in the spring of 530 and Satala in the summer of 530 had temporarily enhanced his legitimacy, the defeat at Callinicum in 531 and the deteriorating strategic situation had a detrimental effect on the emperor's reputation. The legal reforms were met with resistance from the aristocracy from their inception, as they eliminated the ability to utilize obscure laws and jurisprudence to evade unfavorable judgments. Further, both Justinian and his wife Theodora were of low birth - Byzantine society was not as class driven as the feudal-dominated society of the west. The Greens were a Monophysite group and represented the interest of the moneyed non-landowners, Justinian being neither of those. As a result, when Justinian refused to grant amnesty to the two individuals arrested in connection with the riots, it further exacerbated the existing resentment towards him among both, the general population and the aristocracy.

Riots

On January 13, 532 A.D., an angry crowd arrived at the Hippodrome for the races. The Hippodrome was next to the palace complex, so Justinian could preside over the races from the safety of his box in the palace. From the start, the crowd hurled insults at Justinian. By the end of the day, at race 22, the partisan chants had changed from "Blue" or "Green" to a unified  ("Nika", meaning "Win!", "Victory!" or "Conquer!"), and the crowds broke out and began to assault the palace. For the next five days, the palace was under siege. Fires started during the tumult destroyed much of the city, including the city's foremost church, the Hagia Sophia (which Justinian would later rebuild).

Some of the senators saw this as an opportunity to overthrow Justinian, as they were opposed to his new taxes and his lack of support for the nobility. The rioters, now armed and probably controlled by their allies in the Senate, also demanded that Justinian dismiss the prefect John the Cappadocian and the quaestor Tribonian. They then declared a new emperor, Hypatius, a nephew of former Emperor Anastasius I.

Justinian considered fleeing, but his wife Theodora is said to have dissuaded him, saying, "Those who have worn the crown should never survive its loss. Never will I see the day when I am not saluted as empress." She is also credited with adding, "[W]ho is born into the light of day must sooner or later die; and how could an Emperor ever allow himself to be a fugitive." Although an escape route across the sea lay open for the emperor, Theodora insisted that she would stay in the city, quoting an ancient saying, "Royalty is a fine burial shroud," or perhaps, "[the royal colour] Purple makes a fine winding sheet."

Justinian created a plan that involved Narses, a popular eunuch, and the generals Belisarius and Mundus. Carrying a bag of gold given to him by Justinian, the slightly built eunuch entered the Hippodrome alone and unarmed. Narses went directly to the Blues' section, where he approached the important Blues and reminded them that Justinian supported them over the Greens. He also reminded them that Hypatius, the man they crowned, was a Green. He distributed the gold and the Blue leaders spoke quietly with each other and then addressed their followers. In the middle of Hypatius' coronation, many Blues left the Hippodrome, while the Greens remained. Then, Imperial troops led by Belisarius and Mundus stormed into the Hippodrome, killing any remaining people indiscriminately, whether they were Blues or Greens.

About thirty thousand people were reportedly killed. Justinian had Hypatius executed and exiled the senators who had supported the riot. He then rebuilt Constantinople and the Hagia Sophia and was free to establish his rule.

Citations

General and cited sources 
  Popular account based on the author's extensive scholarly research.

External links
 Procopius, "Justinian Suppresses the Nika Revolt, 532", from the Internet Medieval Sourcebook.
 J. B. Bury, "The Nika Revolt", chapter XV part 5 from History of the Later Roman Empire (1923).
 James Grout: "The Nika Riot", part of the Encyclopædia Romana
 Samuel Vancea: "Justinian and the Nike Riots" , published in Clio History Journal

530s in the Byzantine Empire
532 riots
532
6th century in the Byzantine Empire
6th-century rebellions
Constantinople
Justinian I
Massacres in the Byzantine Empire
Sports riots